Pramod Kamble (born 11 August 1964) is an Indian painter, sculptor and creative painter. He promotes eco-friendly idols, with NGOs promoting Ganapatis made of clay and painted in natural colours for a safer festival. He conducts classes on making such eco-friendly idols during Ganesh festival.

Early life

Kamble was born in 1964 into a family of artists. His father was an eminent water color artist and principal of an art institute. He won the National Talent Scholarship for sculpture in Std. 7th. He did his Foundation course and Art Teacher Diploma in Pragat Kala Mahavidyalaya, Ahmednagar, before joining Sir JJ School of Arts, Mumbai.

Career

Notable portraits, creative paintings and sculptures 
 Demonstration of 6 ft. clay panel of Belur Krishna to the Russian delegates who visited his college. Theme monuments of scientists viz. Albert Einstein, Newton, Darwin and Aryabhatt in a residential project in Pune. Ten huge sets which comprises paintings and sculptures of majestic size on the life of Swami Narayan at Swami Narayan temple at Baroda.
 Sculptures of 52 life size models of wild animals has been put up on a permanent Installation in Madhya Pradesh, Pune, Mumbai, Nasik etc.
 'The Spirit'- A pencil drawing on the wall of dimension 90 ft. by 10 ft. depicting a brief history of evolution of Mechanised Infantry Regimental Centre (MIRC), the theme trophy cast in silver for the Silver Jubilee celebrations (MIRC), and the prestigious War Memorial (MIRC).
 1:5 scaled model of Abhay tank for Vehicle Research Development and Establishment (VRDE),Charger at ACC&S.
 Wild animal Sculptures for West Indies
 A 70-feet-tall statue of Sai Baba at the prasadalay in Shirdi.
 He installed a sculpture of a lion's head at Sachin Tendulkar's house.

Donations by sketching
During calamities, he has collected donations from everyday people by sketching them on the streets of Ahmednagar and donating the proceeds to relief funds for the Killari earthquake, Bhuj earthquake, and Kargil war respectively.

Save the environment initiative
He is promoting the idea of clay idol to be installed in each and every house during the Ganapati festival and through the innovative workshop to teach the making of Ganapati idols to each individuals participating the workshop. He is promoting idols of clay instead of Palter of Paris which are not easy to dissolve in the water. He has taken many workshops in the schools and colleges of Ahemdnagar and teaching the participants for the same. In Mumbai, the height of Ganesh idols is too high. In that case, he suggested to use fiberglass idols instead of plaster of Paris. His wife Swati supports him in this initiative.

Sare Jahan Se Achcha Project

A very large pencil drawing "Sare Jahan Se Achcha" – 70 ft. by 20 ft. in dimension was drawn by Kamble. The project started in the year 1996 and was completed on the eve of Independence of 1997. It commemorates the Nation on the occasion of 50 years of Independence on the specially prepared wall of Mahavir Art Gallery in Ahmednagar. This drawing portrays Bharat Mata and almost 500 notable people including sages, deities, freedom fighters, Bharat Ratna awardees, Dadasaheb Phalke awardees, GyanPeeth awardees, Param Vir Chakra recipients and the masters in various fields of life that includes sports-persons, musicians, dancers, painters, theatre personalities, singers, social activists and industrialists.

Awards and achievements
 Govt. of India Scholarship CCRT for Sculpture
 Maharashtra State Award for Painting- 1979-80
 Maharashtra State Award for Sculpture- 1981
 1st Award for J.J. School of Art Annual Exhibition- 1981-82
 Special Award for Art Society of India for Sculpture- 1983
 Advocate Club of Mumbai, Award for Calligraphy- 1983
 Logo Design Award- 1984
 Maharashtra State Award for Painting- 1984
 Portrait Painting Award from Bombay Art Society- 1984
 Special Award for Sculpture in J.J. School of Art Annual Art Exhibition- 1984
 Ashok Jain award for Pencil Drawing- 1984
 Maharashtra State Award for Drawing- 1986
 CEAD Award for Calligraphy- 1983
 CEAD Organised Art Exhibition Social Service Campaign Award- 1990
 Rotary Club of Ahmednagar - Lifetime Achievement Award For "Sare Jahan Se Achha" Project- 1999
 Felicitation From Indian Army Regiment MIRC for Sculpting the War Memorial and Silver Jubilee Trophy- 2005
 Savedi Bhusan Award- 2005
 Mahatma Phule Lifetime Achievement Award- 2010
 Shilpgaurav Puraskar– 2013 in Pune by B.R. Khedkar Pratishtan, Pune
 Bombay Art Society, Art Society of India awards
 Awards in the Applied Art Category in the Theme Communicating National Integration
 Kalagaurav Puraskar
 Kala Gaurav Puraskar in 2011
 World Records of India in 2014 & 2015

Works

Sculpture
 Shivaji
 Various sculptures in Ahmednagar city

Works on wall
 Sare Jahan Se Achcha containing sketches of 500 renounced personalities of India  
 A pencil drawing on a wall in the central hall of the Alpha Mess at the Mechanised Infantry Regimental Center (MIRC), Ahmednagar

Other projects
 Eco-friendly idols during Ganesh festival

References

External links 

1964 births
20th-century Indian painters
Living people
Indian portrait painters
Indian male painters
Indian male sculptors
20th-century Indian sculptors
20th-century Indian male artists